The 1896 Arkansas Industrial Cardinals football team represented the University of Arkansas during the 1896 college football season. During the 1896 season, Arkansas again played two games against Fort Smith High School. Arkansas won both games by scores of 10–0 and 6–2. Drury defeated Arkansas by a 34–0 score.

The roster of the 1896 football team included the following players: H. Y. Fishback (captain); L. R. Putnam; Frank James; T. O. Potts; R. P. Rutherford; V. V. Allen; E. Carter; J. W. Pollard; A. J. McDaniel; L. G. Crowley; J. Mitchell; G. W. Gunnel; F. Horsfall; L. F. Owens; and T. A. Edwards.  John C. Futrall was the team's "manager", and B. N. Wilson was the "trainer".

Schedule

References

Arkansas
Arkansas Razorbacks football seasons
Arkansas Industrial Cardinals football